Regina Lee Hall (born December 12, 1970) is an American actress. She rose to prominence for her role as Brenda Meeks in the comedy horror Scary Movie film series (2000–2006). She has since appeared in the television series Ally McBeal (2001–2002), Law & Order: LA (2010–2011), Grandfathered (2016), and Black Monday (2019–2021), and in the films The Best Man (1999), its 2013 sequel The Best Man Holiday, About Last Night (2014), Vacation (2015), Girls Trip (2017), The Hate U Give (2018), and Little (2019). For the comedy film Support the Girls (2018), Hall received critical acclaim, and became the first African American to win the New York Film Critics Circle Award for Best Actress.

Early life
Hall was born the daughter of a contractor and electrician father, Odie Hall, and a teacher mother, Ruby. After graduating from Immaculata College High School, Hall enrolled at Fordham University in the Bronx, where she graduated with a bachelor's degree in English in 1992. She later enrolled at New York University, where she earned a master's degree in journalism in 1997. Reflecting on college, Hall said: "I loved being a student. I could've gone to school until I was 75 years old as long as somebody would've paid my rent. I would've been a professional student."

She wanted a career with impact and envisioned a career in writing or journalism, but Hall's first semester of graduate school changed drastically when her father died of a stroke. "It was sudden. And I think when sudden events that are painful happen in your life, you know, they redirect your course," Hall reflected. "When you’re young, you don’t grasp the gravity of life. But when you lose someone that you spend most of your life with, and you’re young, you do. And so I think that started me thinking about what I really wanted to do in life. And I know my father would have wanted me to finish school. So I did that." She began a career in the entertainment industry, starting off with a guest appearance on Sadat X's 1996 album Wild Cowboys on the track, "The Interview".

Career

In 1997, Hall appeared in her first television commercial at the age of 26. Her television career began with a role on the soap opera Loving, and guest appearances on the Fox police drama New York Undercover. She played Candy in the 1999 film The Best Man. She left a lasting impression on viewers with her portrayal of the character Candace "Candy" Sparks. Hall reflected: "It was my very first movie. I met Sanaa Lathan on it, and we did Love and Basketball together, which was my second film. And then, at that point, I was visiting L.A. to stay and it led to a third film and a fourth film. And it was really a big deal because I'd never been on a set before." It signaled a pivotal point for Hall's career. As a key member of the all-star cast, she welcomed rising-star status in "black-Hollywood".

Hall gained more recognition with her role in the comedy-horror-spoof Scary Movie (and the sequels Scary Movie 2, Scary Movie 3, and Scary Movie 4) portraying the sex-crazed Brenda Meeks, and the TV movie Disappearing Acts. The Scary Movie films would become some of her best known roles. In 2001, Hall landed the role of Coretta Lipp on the prime-time drama Ally McBeal, which was originally a recurring role over several episodes but was made a main character in the 5th season of the show. A year later, she starred in the action-drama Paid in Full, a film directed by Charles Stone III. Since then, she has appeared in leading roles in films such as Malibu's Most Wanted, King's Ransom and The Honeymooners.

She appeared in the film Law Abiding Citizen in 2009.
She had a role in the 2010 Danneel Harris and Arielle Kebbel  film Mardi Gras. From its fall 2010 debut until a series overhaul in January 2011, Regina Hall portrayed Deputy District Attorney Evelyn Price on Law & Order: LA. 

In 2012, she portrayed Candace Hall in Steve Harvey's movie Think Like a Man, a romantic comedy based on his book Act Like a Lady, Think Like a Man. Hall reprised her role as Candace Sparks in The Best Man Holiday in 2013. She believed the characters had evolved from the first film. Hall felt The Best Man Holiday was different from any sequel she had ever done before since it was not "immediate" and it had been fourteen years since the release of the original. Hall felt the first film had "the joy of the wedding" and in the sequel "they come together for the holidays, but it's deeper than that. This one's definitely different, but we still laughed. There was so much laughter behind the scenes." Hall joked about how all of the male members of the cast were married while all of the women were not, stating that Morris Chestnut was happily married while walking around "with his shirt off!"

Hall appeared in the 2014 film About Last Night, costarring Kevin Hart.
She and Hart were seen as the film's highlight as they had a "great dynamic together" and the two were credited with having the funniest lines in the film. All of the cast was seen as having a "perfect mix of charisma and likability". Jessica Herndon of the Associated Press stated "Hart and Hall are the best part of this film. They play the couple you know all too well: fiery, able to press one another's buttons and always caught in the makeup to breakup game." Negative reviews of the film also praised the pairing of Hall with Kevin Hart. Mick LaSalle of The San Francisco Chronicle expressed that Hart was "well paired for Hall, who matches him for comedy." At the time of the film's release, both Hall and Hart expressed interest in working on other projects together. About Last Night was her third ensemble film and Hall reflected that she learned from actors she worked with in ensembles.

Hall reprised her role as Candace Hall in Think Like a Man Too. She revealed what members of the cast partied the most in the film shortly before the movie's release. "Everyone kind of had their fun, I'm not gonna lie. We went out, we gambled. Kevin [Hart] parties. There were parties, and we all went. It was good fun". In July 2014, it was announced Hall would star in a Lifetime film, entitled With This Ring, with Eve and Jill Scott.

In the 2015 film People Place Things, Hall had a major role as the love interest of a newly divorced man. In 2016, Hall was in Barbershop: The Next Cut. She played the role of Angie, one of the hair stylists, alongside Ice Cube, Common, and Eve. In 2017, Hall co-starred in the comedy film Girls Trip, which became a critical and commercial success. In 2018, Hall was part of the ensemble cast of the drama film The Hate U Give, based on the 2017 novel.

Hall had the lead in Support the Girls, a film directed by Andrew Bujalski. For the latter, she received critical praise, and was nominated for several awards, winning the New York Film Critics Circle Award for Best Actress. She is the first African-American to win the award. That same year she was invited to join the Academy of Motion Picture Arts and Sciences. In 2019, Hall hosted the 2019 BET Awards. 

In October 2020, she inked a first-look deal with Showtime. Under the pact, Hall will develop and produce television projects via her production company, RH Negative. A mere months later, her company signed a six-film deal with ViacomCBS.

She cohosted the 94th Academy Awards with Amy Schumer and Wanda Sykes on March 27, 2022.

Personal life
Around 2004, Hall's mother was diagnosed with scleroderma, a rare autoimmune disease. When not working in Hollywood, Hall can be found volunteering for the care of senior citizens at a Sherman Oaks, California, convalescent home twice a week as well as raising public awareness for the disease. "When my mom was diagnosed, I didn’t know much about the condition. But Dana Delany, who is an actress and now a friend of mine, put me in touch with Bob Saget. Bob had made a television movie about scleroderma years ago because his sister had died from it. That was back when they didn’t even know what it was. Anyway, Bob had a group called the Scleroderma Research Foundation, so I donated to that and my mother even went to the doctor Bob had suggested, who happened to be over at Johns Hopkins." Regina Hall announced in November 2010 that she would be writing for  ABILITY Magazine.

In 2010, when she was 40, Hall unsuccessfully tried to become a Catholic nun after a bad break-up, having previously wanted to become one at the age of 14. In the latter case, she was refused for being too old, as the cut-off age is 39.

In 2014, she signed as an ambassador for Elizabeth Taylor's White Diamonds.

Filmography

Film

Television

Awards and nominations

References

External links

 
 "Regina Hall—Interview", Regina Hall Issue, ABILITY Magazine, April/May 2010

1970 births
Living people
Actresses from Washington, D.C.
African-American actresses
African-American female comedians
21st-century American comedians
American soap opera actresses
American women comedians
Fordham University alumni
New York University alumni
21st-century African-American women
21st-century African-American people
20th-century African-American people
20th-century African-American women